The South African type LP tender was a steam locomotive tender.

The Type LP tender first entered service in 1918, as tenders to the Classes 14C, 15B and MJ1 steam locomotives which were acquired by the South African Railways from Canada in that year.

Manufacturer
Type LP tenders were built between 1918 and 1922 by Montreal Locomotive Works in Canada.

The South African Railways (SAR) placed eight Class MJ1 2-6-6-0 Mallet, 73 Class 14C 4-8-2 Mountain and thirty Class 15B 4-8-2 Mountain type locomotives in service between 1918 and 1922. The locomotives and tender were designed by Montreal Locomotive Works, to the specifications of D.A. Hendrie, Chief Mechanical Engineer of the SAR. The Type LP tender entered service as tenders to these three locomotive classes.

Characteristics

Locomotives
Only the Classes MJ1, 14C and 15B were delivered new with Type LP tenders, which were numbered for their engines in the number ranges as shown. An oval number plate, bearing the engine number and often also the tender type, was attached to the rear end of the tender.
 1918: Class MJ1, numbers 1666 to 1673.
 1918-1922: Class 14C, numbers 1761 to 1780, 1881 to 1900, 1991 to 2010 and 2026 to 2038.
 1918-1922: Class 15B, numbers 1829 to 1838 and 1971 to 1990.

Classification letters
Since many tender types are interchangeable between different locomotive classes and types, a tender classification system was adopted by the SAR. The first letter of the tender type indicates the classes of engines to which it could be coupled. The "L_" tenders could only be used with the three locomotive classes with which they were delivered.

The second letter indicates the tender's water capacity.

Modifications
Most of these tenders were later modified by shortening and raising the upper sides of the coal bunker, in effect making the coal at the rear of the bunker more easily accessible to the stoker and apparently without affecting the tender's coal capacity.

Illustration

References

LP